The Seattle Times is a daily newspaper serving Seattle, Washington, United States. It was founded in 1891 and has been owned by the Blethen family since 1896. The Seattle Times has the largest circulation of any newspaper in Washington state and the Pacific Northwest region.

The Seattle Times Company, which is owned by the Blethen family, holds 50.5% of the paper. McClatchy company owns 49.5% of the paper. The Seattle Times had a longstanding rivalry with the Seattle Post-Intelligencer newspaper until the latter ceased publication in 2009.

Copies are sold at $2 daily in King & adjacent counties (except Island, Thurston & other WA counties, $2.5) or $4 Sundays/Thanksgiving Day. Prices are higher outside Washington state.

History
The Seattle Times originated as the Seattle Press-Times, a four-page newspaper founded in 1891 with a daily circulation of 3,500, which Maine teacher and attorney Alden J. Blethen bought in 1896. Renamed the Seattle Daily Times, it doubled its circulation within half a year. By 1915, circulation stood at 70,000.

The newspaper moved to the Times Square Building at 5th Avenue and Olive Way in 1915. It built a new headquarters, the Seattle Times Building, north of Denny Way in 1930. The paper moved to its current headquarters at 1000 Denny Way in 2011. In 1966 the publication changed to its current name of The Seattle Times. 

The Seattle Times switched from afternoon delivery to mornings on March 6, 2000, citing that the move would help them avoid the fate of other defunct afternoon newspapers. This placed the Times in direct competition with its Joint Operating Agreement (JOA) partner, the morning Seattle Post-Intelligencer. Nine years later, the Post-Intelligencer became an online-only publication.

The Times is one of the few remaining major city dailies in the United States independently operated and owned by a local family (the Blethens). The Seattle Times Company, while owning and operating the Times, also owns three other papers in Washington, and formerly owned several newspapers in Maine that were sold to MaineToday Media. The McClatchy Company owns 49.5 percent of voting common stock in the Seattle Times Company, formerly held by Knight Ridder until 2006.

Awards

The Times reporting has received 11 Pulitzer Prizes, most recently in 2020 for National Reporting of the Boeing 737 MAX crashes  by reporters Dominic Gates, Mike Baker, Steve Miletich and Lewis Kamb. It has an international reputation for its investigative journalism, in particular. In April 2012, investigative reporters Michael Berens and Ken Armstrong won the Pulitzer Prize for Investigative Reporting for a series documenting more than 2,000 deaths caused by the state of Washington's use of methadone as a recommended painkiller in state-supported care. In April 2010, the Times staff won the Pulitzer Prize for Breaking News Reporting for its coverage, in print and online, of the shooting deaths of four police officers in a Lakewood coffee house and the 40-hour manhunt for the suspect. A tenth Pulitzer Prize was awarded in 2015 for breaking news coverage of the Oso mudslide.

Times photographer Jerry Gay won the 1975 Spot News Photography prize for "Lull in the Battle", an image of firefighters resting after fighting a house fire. In 1982 reporter Paul Henderson won the Pulitzer Prize for Investigative Reporting for his coverage of the case of Steve Titus. Titus had been wrongfully convicted of rape, and in a series of articles Henderson challenged the circumstantial evidence in the case, convincing the judge to reverse Titus' conviction.

Controversies

Headline controversy
In February 2002, The Seattle Times ran a subheadline "American outshines Kwan, Slutskaya in skating surprise" after Sarah Hughes won the gold medal at the 2002 Olympics. Many Asian Americans felt insulted by the headline because Michelle Kwan is also American. Asian American community leaders criticized the subheadline as perpetuating a stereotype that people of color can never be truly American.

The incident echoed a similar incident that happened with an MSNBC article during the Winter games in 1998, which was reported on by Times.

The newspaper's Executive Editor at the time of the controversy, Mike Fancher, issued an apology in the aftermath of the controversial headline.

Election controversy
On October 17, 2012, the publishers of The Seattle Times launched advertising campaigns in support of Republican gubernatorial candidate Rob McKenna and a state referendum to legalize same-sex marriage. The newspaper's management said the ads were aimed at "demonstrating how effective advertising with The Times can be." The advertisements in favor of McKenna represent an $80,000 independent expenditure, making the newspaper the third largest contributor to his campaign. More than 100 staffers signed a letter of protest sent to Seattle Times publisher Frank Blethen, calling it an "unprecedented act".

The Joint Operating Agreement

From 1983 to 2009, the Times and Seattle's other major paper, the Hearst-owned Seattle Post-Intelligencer, were run under a "Joint Operating Agreement" (JOA) whereby advertising, production, marketing, and circulation were controlled by the Times for both papers. The two papers maintained their own identities with separate news and editorial departments.

The Times announced its intention to cancel the JOA in 2003, citing a clause in the JOA contract that three consecutive years of losses allowed it to pull out of the agreement. Hearst sued, arguing that a force majeure clause prevented the Times from claiming losses as reason to end the JOA when they result from extraordinary events (in this case, a seven-week strike by members of the Newspaper Guild). While a district judge ruled in Hearst's favor, the Times won on appeal, including a unanimous decision from the Washington State Supreme Court on June 30, 2005. Hearst continued to argue that the Times fabricated its loss in 2002. The two papers announced an end to their dispute on April 16, 2007.

The JOA was terminated when the Post-Intelligencer ceased publication; its final printed edition was March 17, 2009.

Content
The Times contains different sections every day. Each daily edition includes Main News & Business, a NW section for the day, Sports, and any other sections listed below.

Friday: NW Autos; Weekend Plus

Saturday: NW Homes

Sunday: Business; ShopNW; NW Jobs; NW Arts & Life; NW Traveler; Pacific NW Magazine

Pacific NW is a glossy magazine published every week and inserted in the Sunday edition.

Delivery and page width

References

External links

 

Companies based in Seattle
Newspapers published in Seattle
Publications established in 1891
Pulitzer Prize-winning newspapers
Daily newspapers published in the United States
1891 establishments in Washington (state)